Huttwil railway station is a railway station in the municipality of Huttwil, in the Swiss canton of Bern. The Ramsei–Huttwil line sees no service except for seasonal service to  operated by the  heritage railway.

Services 
The following services stop at Huttwil:

References

External links 
 
 

Railway stations in the canton of Bern
BLS railway stations